The 2015–16 UC Davis Aggies men's basketball team represented the University of California, Davis during the 2015–16 NCAA Division I men's basketball season. The Aggies were led by fifth year head coach Jim Les and played their home games at The Pavilion as members of the Big West Conference. They finished the season 11–19, 6–10 in Big West play to finish in fifth place. They lost in the quarterfinals of the Big West tournament to UC Santa Barbara.

Roster

Schedule
Source: 

|-
!colspan=9 style="background:#CB992B; color:#182563;"| Non-Conference Games

|-
!colspan=9 style="background:#CB992B; color:#182563;"| Big West Conference Games

|-
!colspan=9 style="background:#CB992B; color:#182563;"| Big West tournament

References

UC Davis Aggies men's basketball seasons
UC Davis